Les Chemins de Katmandou ("the roads to Kathmandu") is a 1969 novel by the French writer René Barjavel. It tells the story of a man who joins a group of hippies who live and travel in Nepal, where they take drugs and practice free love in the belief that it will free them from materialism, only to meet disappointment.

Adaptation
The novel was written in tandem with a 1969 film  of the same name (in English, The Pleasure Pit), directed by André Cayatte and starring Renaud Verley and Jane Birkin. The film had 1,635,664 admissions in French cinemas.

References

1969 French novels
French novels adapted into films
French-language novels
Hippie movement
Literature related to the sexual revolution
Novels about drugs
Novels by René Barjavel
Novels set in Nepal
Presses de la Cité books